Britney Spears: Live and More! (stylized in lowercase) is the second video album by American recording artist Britney Spears. It was released on VHS on November 21, 2000 and later released on DVD alongside Spears' first video Time Out with Britney Spears (1999) on February 13, 2001. The video includes Spears' performance on Waikiki Beach, Hawaii during her Crazy 2k Tour (2000). Spears toured in Hawaii with a mix of sightseeing, fan appearances, and live performances. The camera follows her as she practices with her dancers, hangs out with friends, and even attempts to dance hula. The highlight is the live performance where Spears sings her songs such as "Oops!...I Did It Again", "(You Drive Me) Crazy" and "...Baby One More Time". The video was a commercial success, peaking at number four on US Top Music Videos, and was certified triple platinum by the Recording Industry Association of America (RIAA). In France, the video was certified platinum by Syndicat National de l'Édition Phonographique (SNEP) for sales of over 20,000 copies. It has sold over 500,000 copies worldwide.

The video album managed to rise to the 2nd place in the UK top 50 music videos chart list.

Synopsis
"Since she first exploded onto the pop music scene in the summer of 1999, Britney Spears has dominated the world. In this collectable, must-have home video, Britney shows just what she can do like nobody else. Who wouldn't want to own the jaw-dropping, eye-popping videos for the hits "Oops!... I Did It Again", "Lucky", and "Stronger"? Britney's never shown such dancing talent, unique style and great singing. Speaking of talent, Britney holds her own and then some when she hosts the legendary TV variety show Saturday Night Live. Who could ever forget Britney as homegirl Down Paslowski on "Morning Latte", meeting "Woodrow the Homeless Man" in the sewer or judging dancer try-outs for her tour? Finally, Britney takes you on a tropical vacation to Oahu, Hawaii, which includes stellar live performances of her hits from her two multi-platinum albums ...Baby One More Time and Oops!... I Did It Again. Plus, you can spend some "down time" with Britney as she enjoys the stunning, sun-soaked beauty of Oahu and its peoplea trip truly worth taking again and again! Britney Spears: Live And More! gives you the many faces of Britney as a live performer, a comedic actress, a fun-loving, all-American teenage girl and a powerful superstar."

Critical reception

Britney Spears: Live and More! received a positive review from AllMusic, receiving three and a half out of five stars.

Commercial performance
Britney Spears: Live and More! was a commercial success. In the United States, the video peaked at number three on US Top Music Videos on December 30, 2000, and was eventually certified triple platinum by the Recording Industry Association of America (RIAA), denoting shipments of over 300,000 copies. However, it only managed to chart outside the United States in Japan, peaking at number forty-five in 2001 after it was released as a DVD. Nevertheless, in France, the video was certified platinum by Syndicat National de l'Édition Phonographique (SNEP) for sales of over 20,000 copies. The video has sold over 500,000 copies worldwide. In the United Kingdom, it peaked at #2.

Track listing

Notes
 The performance of "(You Drive Me) Crazy" on Waikiki Beach, Hawaii suffered from a sound issue, and it needed to be performed again. The songs performed were shorter on the television broadcast and the video. Spears also performed "I Will Be There", Joe sang "I Wanna Know" to Spears, and Destiny's Child performed their song "Say My Name" mid-show, after "From the Bottom of My Broken Heart", but the performances were cut from the video.
Subtitles available in English, Spanish and Japanese.
 The video also includes web links.
The running time of this DVD is 80 minutes.

Charts

Certifications

References

Britney Spears video albums
Britney Spears live albums
2000 live albums
2000 video albums
Live video albums
Jive Records live albums
Jive Records video albums